Lincoln Law School may refer to one of two unrelated California law schools:

Lincoln Law School of San Jose, San Jose, California, a part of the Californian Lincoln University until 1993
Lincoln Law School of Sacramento, Sacramento, California

It may also refer to:
School of Law at the University of Lincoln in England
University of Nebraska College of Law in Lincoln, Nebraska
Lincoln College of Law in Springfield, Illinois
Lincoln University School of Law in St. Louis, Missouri